Neeleman is a surname. Notable people with the surname include:

Ad Neeleman (born 1964), Dutch linguist
David Neeleman (born 1959), Brazilian-American businessman
Mark Neeleman (born 1959), Dutch sailor
Stanley D. Neeleman (born 1943), American Mormon leader and lawyer
Wim Neeleman, Dutch curler and curling coach